Cox Green railway station served the civil parish of Cox Green, Tyne and Wear, England, from 1854 to 1964 on the Penshaw Branch.

History 
The station opened as Coxgreen Crossing in November 1854 by the North Eastern Railway. It was situated in the north side of Coxgreen Road. Its name was changed to Coxgreen in April 1857. It initially had short platforms but they were doubled in size in 1896 as well as more services per day. Its name was changed again to Cox Green in July 1931. It didn't attract as many passengers as Hylton because of its isolated location; Hylton had booked 54,250 passengers, whereas Cox Green booked 9,095 passengers. It was downgraded to an unstaffed halt on 14 August 1961 and it closed on 4 May 1964. The station building remains in residential use but it has been expanded since.

References

External links 

Disused railway stations in Tyne and Wear
Former North Eastern Railway (UK) stations
Beeching closures in England
Railway stations opened in 1854
Railway stations closed in 1964
1854 establishments in England
1964 disestablishments in England
Railway stations in Great Britain opened in the 19th century